The Swedish Parkinson Academy (SPA) was founded in 2007 and is based at Lund University in Sweden.

The main aim of the academy is to stimulate preclinical and clinical research related to Parkinson's disease, especially to support translational projects (projects bridging the border between preclinical and clinical research, bringing promising preclinical results to clinical studies).

Main research areas include:
 methods for early diagnosis (biomarkers),
 neuroprotective therapies (growth factors),
 restorative therapies (cell and gene therapy), and
 improved methods for evaluation of symptomatology and effect of therapy.

The SPA employs (partly or fully) ten scientists and is led by a steering group consisting of representatives from preclinical and clinical neuroscience as well as patient organizations. SPA organizes education and meetings regarding Parkinson's disease, on Swedish and international level.

References

External links
 The Swedish Parkinson Academy's website

Neurology organizations
Lund University
2007 establishments in Sweden
Medical and health organizations based in Sweden